Nairai is an island of Fiji belonging to the Lomaiviti Archipelago.  The island is of volcanic origin and has a land area of about 30 square kilometers.

Its population of approximately 1500-2000 Fijians lives in coastal villages. Economic activity is subsistence farming and fishing, one tourist resort is currently under construction. The island has no airport, transport is by local cargo vessels or small boats.

There are five villages in this island, consisting of Natauloa which is the chiefly village and `the seat' of `the Turaga na Tui Nairai' and also the high Chief of the island, Tovulailai where the new wharf is currently being constructed, Vutuna, Lawaki, and Waitoga.

The government of Commodore Frank Bainimarama has been very supportive on development works on this island since 2007 and when government was trying to introduce the `Peoples Charter', which was rejected by the Lomaiviti Provincial Council, but accepted only by the Districts or Tikinas of Nairai and Sawaieke.

After completion of this new wharf,`around the island road' is also earmarked as a token of appreciation by Government, to the Tui Nairai and his people's approval, to wholeheartedly accepting and acknowledging the `Peoples Charter' as the new `instrument of change', introduced by them for the people of Fiji.

Looking at the chiefly village of Natauloa, the three chiefly clans, namely Mataqali Valebalavu, Mataqali Namoala and Mataqali Tarani constituted the main `land owning units' where villages are members by birth through blood link, on the fathers side.

This link entitles members as joint owners to all designated lands and traditional status registered specifically for individual clans under `I Taukei Lands Trust Board' and `Native Lands Commission' or `Valenivolavola Ni Kawa Bula'.

Islands of Fiji
Lomaiviti Province